Rappa Mundi is the second album by Brazilian band O Rappa. It was produced by Arnolpho Lima Filho (Liminha). It is distributed through Warner Music.

Track listing
"A Feira" - 3:59
"Miséria S.A." - 4:01
"Vapor Barato" - 4:23
"Ilê Ayê" – 3:50
"Hey Joe" – 4:25
"Pescador De Ilusões" - 4:15
"Uma Ajuda" - 4:29
"Eu Quero Ver Gol" - 3:41
"Eu Não Sei Mentir Direito" - 4:03
"O Homem Bomba" - 3:14
"Tumulto" - 3:14
"Lei Da Sobrevivência (Palha De Cana)" - 3:05
"Óia O Rapa" - 6:00

Personnel

O Rappa
 Marcelo Falcão - voz e guitarra
 Marcelo Yuka - bateria
 Xandão - guitarra
 Marcelo Lobato - teclados, samplers e vocais
 Lauro Farias - baixo, synth bass e vocais

Músicos convidados
 Armando Marçal - percussão
 Dj Cléston - scratches e samplers adicionais
 Liminha - guitarra, baixo, programação de ritmos em "Miséria S.A.", "Vapor Barato", "Hey Joe" e "Lei da Sobrevivência" / órgão e EBow em "Uma Ajuda"
 Marcelo D2 - participação especial em "Hey Joe"

References

O Rappa albums
1996 albums
Albums produced by Liminha